Namaka is a hamlet in southern Alberta, Canada within Wheatland County. Its name means "near the water" in Blackfoot. The first school was built in 1909.

Demographics 

See also 
List of communities in Alberta
List of designated places in Alberta
List of hamlets in Alberta

References 

Hamlets in Alberta
Designated places in Alberta
Wheatland County, Alberta